DC Black Label, also referred to simply as Black Label, is an imprint of American comic book publisher DC Comics consisting of original miniseries and reprints of books previously published under other imprints. The imprint intends to present traditional DC Universe characters for a mature audience with stand-alone Prestige Format series. The first title of the imprint, Batman: Damned, was shipped on September 19, 2018.

With the discontinuation of DC's Vertigo imprint, new and current series, as well as reprints of old titles, are being published under the DC Black Label imprint beginning in 2020.

Comic books
Single issues of comic books that are issued under the Black Label line will be published in Prestige Format. If a comic book series exceeds a miniseries run length, it will be published in standard format.

Black Label lines

The Sandman Universe

In August 2018, The Sandman Universe was unveiled by creator Neil Gaiman, initially published under Vertigo. DC closed Vertigo in January 2020 as part of a reorganization of age-directed imprints. All Sandman Universe titles are currently published under DC Black Label.

Hill House Comics

Hill House Comics is a pop-up horror line of comics founded and curated by Joe Hill under DC Black Label. The first release, Basketful of Heads #1, written by Joe Hill, was released on October 30, 2019. There is also a backup story, Sea Dogs, written by Joe Hill in every comic series, with each chapter of this story following the order of when each comic issue under Hill House Comics was released.

Murphyverse

In March 2020, following the success of Batman: White Knight and Batman: Curse of the White Knight, both comics created by Sean Murphy, it was reported that DC was interested in creating a mini-imprint centered around Murphy's works. Referred to as the "Murphyverse", the imprint intends to feature limited series set in the shared universe first established in the White Knight series.

Collected editions

References

External links
 "DC LAUNCHES NEW PUBLISHING IMPRINT DC BLACK LABEL". DC Comics (Burbank, California). March 8, 2018. Retrieved August 17, 2018.
 Beedle, Tim (June 15, 2018). "Shedding New Light on DC Black Label". DC Comics (Burbank California). Retrieved August 17, 2018.

DC Comics imprints
Publishers of adult comics
2018 in comics
2019 in comics
2020 in comics
2021 in comics
2022 in comics